This is a list of Asian stock exchanges.

In the Asian region, there are multiple stock exchanges. As per data from World Federation of Exchanges, below are top 10 selected in 2020: 

 Shanghai Stock Exchange, China
 Tokyo Stock Exchange, Japan
 Hong Kong Stock Exchange, Hong Kong
 Shenzhen Stock Exchange, China
 Bombay Stock Exchange, India 
 National Stock Exchange, India
 Korea Exchange, South Korea
 Taiwan Stock Exchange, Taiwan
 Singapore Exchange, Singapore
 The Stock Exchange of Thailand, Thailand

Asian stock exchanges by UN subregion 
List of Asian stock exchanges by UN subregion.

Central Asia

Eastern Asia

Northern Asia

Southeast Asia

Southern Asia

Western Asia

See also
Federation of Euro-Asian Stock Exchanges
List of stock exchanges

References

External links

Information pages for each of India's stock exchanges at Surf India

Stock Exchanges
Lists of stock exchanges